Park Ji-yeon (born May 14, 1988) is a South Korean actress. Park debuted in musical Mamma Mia! in 2010. Park has appeared in supporting roles in various dramas but is better known for her work as a musical actress. 

Park's television debut was on tvN's Oh My Ghost (2015). After that, she played Kang Eun-ju in KBS2's Mad Dog (2017) and Oh Jung-soo in KBS1's Andante (2017). After that, she acted as Yoon Hoon (Kim Hye-eun) in tvN historical drama series Mr. Sunshine (2018), nurse Lee So-jung in JTBC's Life (2018), and role of Cho-hong in SBS Haechi (2019).

Her most known works in small screen are Bloody Heart (2022) that earned her best supporting actress award in 2022 KBS Drama Awards.

Early Years 
Park Ji-yeon developed an interest in music from an early age. While attending science major in Youngsaeng High School, Park formed a high-school rock band and sung as a vocalist. Park initially wanted to applied to the Department of Practical Music. While searching the internet to find related information, Park found musical clips for the first time. Since then Park also became interested in acting and decided to enroll in an acting academy near her house in Suwon. Park enrolled to the acting department of Seoul Institute of the Arts. However, due to her love of music, Park was not really set on becoming an actress yet.

Career 

In 2010, at the recommendation of a senior, Park went to the audition of Korean production of musical Mamma Mia! When Park appeared in the audition with application letter with no experience written, she made the staff nervous. However Park made everyone surprised when she sang the audition song. Park passed the audition for the role of Sophie, her debut stage was a performance held at the Gyeonggi Icheon Art Hall.

Since then, Park has been active as a main character in musical works, from Go Mi-nam (Go Mi-nyeo) in the creative musical You're Beautiful to Éponine in Les Miserables and Molly in Ghost. In 2013, she swept the rookie awards two musical awards, the Korean Musical Awards and The Musical Awards for her role Eponine in Les Miserables. Park was called a rising star in the musical world. 

Park's television debut was on of tvN's Oh My Ghost (2015). After that, she played Kang Eun-ju in KBS2's Mad Dog (2017) and Oh Jung-soo in KBS2's Andante (2017). 

After eight years as musical actress, Park made her theatrical debut in the National Theater of Korea production of Shakespeare's Richard III, for which she received favorable reviews. Production started in February 2018 and ended in early-March of that year. After that, she acted as Yoon Hoon (Kim Hye-eun) in tvN historical drama series Mr. Sunshine (2018) and followed by the role of nurse Lee So-jung in JTBC's Life (2018). In winter of 2018, Park was back to musical. She was selected for the role helper-bot Claire in 2018 revival of musical Maybe Happy Ending. Directed by Kim Dong-yeon, it was performed in Vivaldi Park Hall, Daemyung Cultural Factory Building 1, Seoul from November 13, 2018, to February 10, 2019. 

In 2019, Park acted as the role of Cho-hong in SBS historical drama Haechi.  The role of Park Ji-young then followed – a role with different personalities in two parallel universes in the tvN drama The King: Eternal Monarch. Later, Park reunited with director Kim Dong-yeon in 2019 Korean revival of musical Cyrano.

Filmography

Television series

Web series

Television entertainment program

Music video

Stage

Concert

Musical

Play

Discography

Awards and nominations

References

External links
 
 

1988 births
Living people
South Korean television actresses
South Korean stage actresses
South Korean musical theatre actresses
South Korean film actresses
21st-century South Korean actresses
Seoul Institute of the Arts alumni